Report from Practically Nowhere is a 1959 humorous travelogue by American journalist John Sack, illustrated by Shel Silverstein. The book consists of thirteen profiles of microstates, principalities, autonomous areas, and other places visited by the author:

Lundy
Sark
Andorra
Monaco
Liechtenstein
San Marino
Sovereign Military Order of Malta
Mount Athos
Sharja
Swat
Amb
Punial
Sikkim

Sequels
In 1974, Tori Haring-Smith revisited ten of the thirteen countries, supported by a Thomas J. Watson Fellowship.

See also
News from Nowhere

References

1959 non-fiction books
American travel books
Harper & Brothers books
Books about Andorra
Works about Liechtenstein
Books by Shel Silverstein